John Groves (16 September 1933 – 26 June 2017) was an English professional footballer best known as a player for Luton Town.

Personal life
He was the son of former Halifax Town, Blackburn Rovers, Derby County and Portsmouth forward, Arthur Groves and uncle of darts player Laurence Ryder.

Career

Born in Langwith, Derbyshire, Groves signed for Luton Town in 1949 and turned professional on his 17th birthday. After making his debut during the 1953–54 season, Groves made 251 appearances for the club over ten seasons, including an appearance in the 1959 FA Cup Final, before signing for Bournemouth & Boscombe Athletic in 1963. Groves ended his career with 54 league matches for Bournemouth & Boscombe.

References

1933 births
2017 deaths
Footballers from Derby
Association football midfielders
English footballers
Luton Town F.C. players
AFC Bournemouth players
English Football League players
FA Cup Final players